Ruehmnenteria is a genus of mites in the family Nenteriidae.

Species
 Ruehmnenteria alzueti (Hirschmann, 1985)     
 Ruehmnenteria bretonensis (Hirschmann, 1978)     
 Ruehmnenteria breviunguiculata (Willmann, 1949)     
 Ruehmnenteria chihuahuaensis (Hirschmann, 1978)     
 Ruehmnenteria durangoensis (Hirschmann, 1978)     
 Ruehmnenteria eulaelaptis (Vitzthum, 1930)     
 Ruehmnenteria eutamiasae (Hirschmann, 1978)     
 Ruehmnenteria gasellana (Hirschmann & Wisniewski, 1985)     
 Ruehmnenteria hirschmanni (Wisniewski, 1979)     
 Ruehmnenteria israelensis (Hirschmann & Hiramatsu, 1985)     
 Ruehmnenteria japonensis (Hiramatsu, 1979)     
 Ruehmnenteria javae (Wisniewski & Hirschmann, 1981)     
 Ruehmnenteria kokopoana (Wisniewski & Hirschmann, 1990)     
 Ruehmnenteria koreae (Hirschmann, 1981)     
 Ruehmnenteria kurosai (Hiramatsu, 1979)     
 Ruehmnenteria laosiana (Hirschmann & Wisniewski, 1985)     
 Ruehmnenteria laplatae (Hirschmann, 1985)     
 Ruehmnenteria longispinosa (Hirschmann & Wisniewski, 1985)     
 Ruehmnenteria mahunkai (Hirschmann, 1972)     
 Ruehmnenteria malayica (Vitzthum, 1921)     
 Ruehmnenteria manca (Berlese, 1916)     
 Ruehmnenteria margaritaensis (Sellnick, 1963)     
 Ruehmnenteria mercuri (Hirschmann & Wisniewski, 1985)     
 Ruehmnenteria microti (Hirschmann, 1978)     
 Ruehmnenteria nuciphila (Hirschmann & Wisniewski, 1985)     
 Ruehmnenteria orghidani (Hutu, 1977)     
 Ruehmnenteria pallida (Vitzthum, 1925)     
 Ruehmnenteria pisarskii (Hirschmann & Wisniewski, 1985)     
 Ruehmnenteria plumata (Hirschmann & Wisniewski, 1985)     
 Ruehmnenteria potosi (Hirschmann, 1978)     
 Ruehmnenteria riedeli (Wisniewski & Hirschmann, 1990)     
 Ruehmnenteria ruehmi (Hirschmann, 1972)     
 Ruehmnenteria rwandae (Hirschmann & Wisniewski, 1985)     
 Ruehmnenteria saltoensis (Hirschmann, 1978)     
 Ruehmnenteria stylifera (Berlese, 1904)     
 Ruehmnenteria sudanensis (Hirschmann, 1972)     
 Ruehmnenteria sumatrensis (Hirschmann & Wisniewski, 1985)     
 Ruehmnenteria uruguayensis (Wisniewski & Hirschmann, 1988)     
 Ruehmnenteria venezolana (Sellnick, 1963)     
 Ruehmnenteria venezuelae (Hirschmann & Wisniewski, 1985)     
 Ruehmnenteria vitzthumi (Hirschmann & Wisniewski, 1985)  
 Ruehmnenteria zerbabomia (Hilldigger Hohn, 1992)

References

Mesostigmata
Acari genera